Arotrophora tubulosa is a species of moth of the family Tortricidae. It is found on Fiji in the South Pacific Ocean.

The wingspan is about 21 mm. The forewings are brownish with a pink-violet hue and strigulated (finely streaked) with red brown. The basal area is white with a blackish spot at the costa, followed by a yellowish suffusion. The hindwings are brownish, but paler basally.

Etymology
The species name refers to the shape of the antrum and is derived from Latin tubulus (meaning small tube).

References

Moths described in 2009
Arotrophora
Moths of Fiji